Göktan Gürpüz (born 22 January 2003) is a professional footballer who plays as a midfielder for Borussia Dortmund II. Born in Germany, he is a youth international for Turkey.

Career
Gürpüz is a youth product of the academies of Hamborn 07, Schalke and Borussia Dortmund. He was promoted to Borussia Dortmund's reserves in 2021, and made bench appearances for the senior squad in the Bundesliga several times during the 2022-23 season. On 17 December 2021, he signed his first professional contract with the club. He made his professional debut with Borussia Dortmund II in a 2–0 3. Bundesliga loss to Freiburg II on 28 August 2022.

International career
Born in Germany, Gürpüz is of Turkish descent. He first represented the Turkey U16s in 2019, before playing for the Germany U19s in 2021. In November 2021, he again switched to represent the Turkey U21s in November 2022.

Playing style
Gürpüz is an intelligent midfielder who is quick to act and has good positional awareness.

References

External links

Profile at the Borussia Dortmund website
 
 DFB Profile
 
 

2003 births
Living people
Sportspeople from Duisburg
Turkish footballers
Turkey under-21 international footballers
Turkey youth international footballers
German footballers
Germany youth international footballers
German people of Turkish descent
Association football midfielders
3. Liga players
Borussia Dortmund II players